Champion versus Champion (CVC) is a football tournament organised in Fiji by the Fiji Football Association.  This pair of home-and-away games are played as a season opener. In the old format the National Football League winner played the Inter-district Championship winner and in case these are the same team, the winner of the Battle of the Giants played. However, beginning at the start of 2010 season, winners of all the major tournaments in the Super Premier League, take part in this championship. In 2010, Ba (2009 Battle of the Giants Champion), Lautoka (2009 National League Champion) and Navua (2009 IDC and Fiji FACT Champion) took part in this home-away round robin game series. The team registering the highest number of points, (and in case of a tie, the best goal difference) is the winner of the title.

Champion versus Champion winners

References

External links 
 The Rec.Sport.Soccer Statistics Foundation.
 Ba reclaims CVC title
 Ba takes first blood

Football competitions in Fiji
Fiji